Anagani Satya Prasad is MLA (Member of Legislative Assembly) from Repalle Constituency in Guntur District, Andhra Pradesh. He is from the Gowda community and was elected to assembly elections in 2014, defeating Mopidevi Venkata Ramana of YSRCP. He is considered to be the happiest person of Andhra Pradesh.

Personal life and education 
Anagani Satya Prasad (born January 10, 1972) was son of Anagani Ranga Rao. He was the relative of Anagani Bhagavantha Rao who was elected as MLA from Kuchinapudi constituency and served as minister in 1970–80s. Though his family was native of Cherukuapalli mandal, Satya Prasad childhood and education happened in Hyderabad city itself. His educational qualifications are as follows.

He was unmarried as of June 2014 as per affidavit submitted for elections.

Professional and political career 
He was into real estate business on large scale in and around Hyderabad. He was a successful businessman and was paying IT returns of 9 lakhs and 12 lakhs per annum in 2012–13 and 2013–14. He does not have any criminal cases pending against him as of 2014.

After the reconstitution of constituencies in 2009 and subsequent defeat of TDP in Repalle, probable retirement of Mummaneni Venkata Subbaih (Then TDP candidate) brought Anagani Satya Prasad into the political arena. The decision of TDP to allot 100 seats to BCs then was an enabling factor for him. In 2009 he contested the elections but lost. But he emerged victorious in the 2014 and 2019 elections.

He was member of Joint committee on Library in A. P. legislative assembly.

References

Andhra Pradesh MLAs 2014–2019
Telugu Desam Party politicians
1972 births
Place of birth missing (living people)
Living people
Andhra Pradesh MLAs 2019–2024